Ripley is a civil parish in the Amber Valley district of Derbyshire, England. The parish contains 62 listed buildings that are recorded in the National Heritage List for England. Of these, five are listed at Grade II*, the middle of the three grades, and the others are at Grade II, the lowest grade.  The parish contains the town of Ripley, smaller settlements including Ambergate, Bullbridge, Butterley, Fritchley, Heage, Nether Heage and Waingroves, and the surrounding countryside.  The Cromford Canal, now partly closed, runs through the parish, and the listed buildings associated with it are bridges and an embankment.  Also running through the parish is a railway that originated as the North Midland Railway with a later branch, the Manchester, Buxton, Matlock and Midland Junction Railway, and associated with these are bridges, viaducts, a goods shed, and the portals of a tunnel.  Most of the other listed buildings are houses, cottages and associated structures, farmhouses and farm buildings.  The other listed buildings include churches, a windmill, a pair of coke iron furnaces, factory buildings, public houses, mileposts, colliery buildings, a railway station and signal box at Butterley, and a war memorial.


Key

Buildings

References

Citations

Sources

 

Lists of listed buildings in Derbyshire